Citizens' Trust Company Building, also known as the Sycamore Building, is a historic office building located at Terre Haute, Vigo County, Indiana. It was designed in 1920 by the local firm of Johnson, Miller & Miller and built in 1921–1922, and is a 12-story, Chicago school style steel frame building sheathed in brick.  It features stone and terra cotta detailing and Art Deco style design elements. The building was built to house the main office of the Citizens' Trust Company.

It was listed on the National Register of Historic Places in 1983.

References

Commercial buildings on the National Register of Historic Places in Indiana
Art Deco architecture in Indiana
Commercial buildings completed in 1922
Buildings and structures in Terre Haute, Indiana
National Register of Historic Places in Terre Haute, Indiana
1922 establishments in Indiana
Chicago school architecture in Indiana